Winanda Spoor (born 27 January 1991) is a Dutch road cyclist, who last rode for American amateur team Fast Chance p/b THTF. She participated at the 2012 UCI Road World Championships in the Women's team time trial for the  team.

Major results

2008
 7th Time trial, UEC European Junior Road Championships
 9th Time trial, UCI Juniors World Championships
2011
 1st Knokke-Heist–Bredene
2014
 1st Stage 4 Tour de Feminin-O cenu Českého Švýcarska
2015
 1st  Club rider classification Energiewacht Tour
 9th Omloop van de IJsseldelta
2017
 1st  Sprints classification Holland Ladies Tour

References

External links
 
 

1991 births
Living people
Dutch female cyclists
People from Rijswijk
Cyclists from South Holland
21st-century Dutch women